Soil sealing or soil surface sealing is the loss of soil resources due to the covering of land for housing, roads or other construction work. Covering or replacing the topsoil with impervious materials like asphalt and cement as a result of urban development and infrastructure construction paired with compaction of the underlying soil layers results in the mostly irreversible loss of relevant soil ecosystem services.

References

See also 
Soil compaction
Land consumption
Impervious surface

Soil erosion
Soil science
Soil degradation